On 4 December 2015, a deadly fire broke out in the northern part of platform No. 10 at the western section of the Gunashli oilfield operated by SOCAR. The fire started, according to SOCAR, when a high-pressure subsea gas pipeline was damaged in a heavy storm. As a result of the fire, the platform, which had been in service since 1984, partially collapsed. Fire spread to several oil and gas wells. Production at all 28 wells (24 oil wells and 4 gas wells) connected to the platform was suspended, pipelines connecting the platform to the shore were closed, and electricity to the platform was cut off. About 60% of the oil produced by SOCAR was transported through this platform. 

At the time of the accident, 63 workers were on the platform.  According to the Ministry of Emergency Situations of Azerbaijan, 12 workers are confirmed killed, 18 are still missing (as of December 2017), 33 were rescued; and nine were hospitalized. According to SOCAR, people went missing when a life boat with 34 people on board fell from the platform into the sea and was damaged after hitting piles of the platform.  On 5 December, the Prosecutor General's Office launched a criminal investigation into the possible violation of fire safety rules. President of Azerbaijan Ilham Aliyev has signed an Order declaring 6 December 2015 a day of mourning for those who died in the incident.

References

Oil platform disasters
2015 industrial disasters
Maritime incidents in 2015
2015 fires in Asia
2015 in Azerbaijan
Fires in Azerbaijan
2015 disasters in Azerbaijan
December 2015 events in Asia